Szczuka ("pike" in Old Polish) is a Polish surname. Notable people with this surname include:

 Kazimiera Szczuka (born 1966), Polish writer and television personality
 Mieczysław Szczuka (1898–1927), Polish artist and mountaineer
 Stanisław Antoni Szczuka (1654–1710), Polish politician and writer

See also
 

Polish-language surnames